100 Miles of Hate is the unofficial nickname given to the American college football rivalry game between the Middle Tennessee Blue Raiders football team of Middle Tennessee State University and Western Kentucky Hilltoppers football team of Western Kentucky University. Fans began to refer to the game as "100 Miles of Hate" when the rivalry resumed in 2007 after a 16-year hiatus.

History
The universities, which first played each other in 1914, are separated by about 100 miles (161 km) along U.S. Route 231. For much of their football histories, they have been conference rivals in leagues such as the Ohio Valley Conference and Sun Belt Conference. The rivalry was on hiatus from 1991 to 2007, resuming after Western Kentucky transitioned to Football Bowl Subdivision play and became a football member of the Sun Belt Conference in 2009 (Western Kentucky had been a non-football member of that conference since 1982). After Middle Tennessee left the Sun Belt for Conference USA (C-USA) in 2013, the rivalry again went on hiatus. However, the rivalry was renewed in 2014 when Western Kentucky joined C-USA. The match up usually generates a substantial amount of excitement within the respective fan bases, and tensions are usually high in every meeting.

Game results

See also 
 List of NCAA college football rivalry games

References

College football rivalries in the United States
Middle Tennessee Blue Raiders football
Western Kentucky Hilltoppers football
Recurring sporting events established in 1914